Madirasi is a 2012 Malayalam action comedy film directed by Shaji Kailas and starring Jayaram, Meera Nandan, Meghana Raj, Kalabhavan Mani, Tini Tom, John Vijay and Kailash. The film is based on a series of true incidents that took place in the city of Madras, known in Malayalam as "Madirasi". Madirasi is however described as a part of Coimbatore in the film.

Plot
The film tells the story of Chandran Pillai (Jayaram), a widower from a village in Kerala. Bhama (Meera Nandan), who is a teacher, wants to marry Chandran Pillai and be a mother to his son, whom she likes a lot. The story begins with a Delhi-based young journalist named Jayakrishnan (Kailash) getting kidnapped. In the meantime, Chandran Pillai travels to Madirasi, to buy for his son a brand new cycle. There he is drawn into a very vicious circle when he goes probing the disappearance of Johny (Kalabhavan Mani), a police constable.

Cast
 Jayaram as Chandran Pillai
 Meera Nandan as Bhama
 Meghana Raj as Maya
 Kalabhavan Mani as Johny
 Tini Tom as Jayapalan
 John Vijay as Devaram, Superintendent of Police
 Kailash as Jayakrishnan
 Kochu Preman as Nambeeshan
 Aishwarya as Ragini (Devaram's wife)
 Alphonsa as Mallika
 Janardhanan as Kurup
 Sreelatha Namboothiri as Chandran's mother
 Sunil Sukhada as Church Father
 Sasi Kalinga as Olimpian
 Bheeman Raghu as Aschenkeeri
 Santhosh as Udumpi Mani
 Manju Sajish

Production
After 21 years, Jayaram and Shaji Kailas finally collaborated on a movie. The last time they were seen together was for the movie Kilukkampetty released in 1991. "Jayaram and I have been discussing to do a movie for four to five years. When I did the script for Madirasi, I thought Jayaram was the apt person to essay the role," says Shaji.

Release
The film, initially planned to be released in October, was then announced to have a 23 November release. The film was again postponed to 7 December and the reason for the delay was the theater strike.

Critical response
The film was panned by critics. Unni R Nair, in his review for Kerala9.com, rated the film  and said, "Shaji Kailas seems to have lost his touch. His last film, Simhasanam, was a let down. Now his latest, Madirashi, seems to re-iterate this fact. The film is a mess and disappoints you beyond all limits." Veeyen of Nowrunning.com gave a  rating and said, "I had always felt that Shaji Kailas needed to rediscover himself. But now, after Madirasi, I have serious doubts about the reinvention idea. " Theaterbalcony.com gave a 49% rating and said, "There is nothing which will amuse us in Madirasi, be it some genuine laugh, story, or performances."

Soundtrack

The film has one song composed by the composer duo Satish Sujith. The lyrics are by Mohan Udhinoor.

References

External links
 

Link to the video of the sound track on YouTube : https://www.youtube.com/watch?v=yjn9xvQDH3U

2012 films
Indian action comedy films
2012 action comedy films
2010s Malayalam-language films
2012 comedy films
Films directed by Shaji Kailas